Perfect 10 is a 2019 British feature film, written and directed by Eva Riley. It stars teenage gymnast and actress Frankie Box as Leigh, whose life and training is disrupted by changes in her family life.  The film had its world premiere at the BFI London Film Festival on 3 October 2019, and was released in the UK on the 7 August 2020.

Plot
Leigh is a 15-year-old living with her father and preparing for her first gymnastics competition.  Her life is disrupted when her older half-brother Joe, who she never knew she had, unexpectedly moves in.  The disruption affects her gymnastics performance and Joe leads her into a world of moped crime.

Cast 
 Frankie Box as Leigh, a teenage gymnast
 Alfie Deegan as Joe, Leigh's half brother
 Sharlene Whyte as Gemma, Gymnastics coach
 William Ash as Rob, Leigh's Dad

Production
The film was shot in and around Brighton, East Sussex.  Composed music is attributed to Terence James Dunn,  with Crazy, Stoned & Gone by Angelo De Augustine also included on the soundtrack.

Release
Perfect 10 had its world premiere at the BFI London Film Festival on 3 October 2019. It was released on 8 July 2020 in France, and 7 August 2020 in the UK.<ref name="ScreenD"

Accolades
Cath Clarke in a film review for The Guardian described the film as "a dazzling coming-of-age tale lit up by a pair of remarkable first-time performances". The film won The Discovery Award at the British Independent Film Awards in February 2021.

References

External links
 

2019 directorial debut films
2019 films
British drama films
Films shot in East Sussex
Brighton
Gymnastics films
2010s English-language films
2010s British films